Cirrhochrista minuta is a moth in the family Crambidae first described by Charles Swinhoe in 1902. It is found in Malaysia.

References

Moths described in 1902
Spilomelinae
Moths of Asia